The BENE-League Handball 2018-19 was the sixth edition of the multi-national handball competition between Belgium and the Netherlands.

Achilles Bocholt were defending champions.

Clubs

Rangking

Final Four

Semifinals

Match for third place

Final

Awards
Goalkeeper: 
Right wing: 
Right back: 
Centre back: 
Left back: 
Left wing: 
Pivot:

References

External links 
 Official website

BENE-League Handball
2018–19 domestic handball leagues